Jimmy Miller (1942–1994) was an American record producer and musician.

Jimmy Miller may also refer to:

 Jimmy Miller (footballer, born 1871) (1871–1907), Scottish footballer for Sunderland, Rangers and Scotland 
 Jimmy Miller (footballer, born 1889), English footballer
 Jimmy Miller (American football), American football coach

See also
 James Miller (disambiguation)
 Jim Miller (disambiguation)
 Jimmy Millar (disambiguation)